The 1998 Winchester Council election took place on 7 May 1998 to elect members of Winchester District Council in Hampshire, England. One third of the council was up for election and the Liberal Democrats stayed in overall control of the council.

After the election, the composition of the council was
Liberal Democrat 37
Conservative 10
Labour 4
Independent 4

Election result

References

1998
1998 English local elections
1990s in Hampshire